Ismail Jamil Nanoua, (?? - 22 June 2017), is a Lebanese actor and voice actor.

Filmography

Films
Khallet Warde - Abu Subhi. 2011

Television
Al Ghaliboun. 2011

Dubbing roles 
 Alice in Wonderland - Dodo (Classical Arabic version)
 Matt Hatter Chronicles - Alfred Hatter
 Mokhtarnameh - Suleiman ibn Sird, Al-Muhallab ibn Abi Sufra
 Over the Garden Wall - Enoch, Mr. Langtree
 Planes: Fire & Rescue - Ol' Jammer
 Saint Mary
 Teen Titans: Trouble in Tokyo - Bookstore Owner, Mayor
 The Incredibles - Rick Dicker, The Underminer (Classical Arabic version)
 The Men of Angelos - The judge
 The Smurfs - Gargamel (Image Production House version)
 Uncle Grandpa

References 
 General
 
 http://www.almadapaper.net/ar/news/505827/إسماعيل-نعنوع-لـالمدى-دبلجة-شخصية--شر-شب
 http://www.elcinema.com/person/1107627
 http://www.elfilm.com/name/4597417
 Specific

Lebanese male actors
Lebanese male voice actors
20th-century Lebanese male actors
21st-century Lebanese male actors
Lebanese male television actors
2017 deaths